Mamacruz is a 2023 Spanish-language comedy drama film directed by Patricia Ortega which stars Kiti Mánver.

Plot 
The plot concerns about the rediscovery of an old woman's long-forgotten sexuality and desire.

Cast

Production 
Initially developed by Ortega in her native Venezuela, the project did not manage to persuade potential co-producers to work in the country. Upon a meeting of Ortega with Olmo Figueredo at 2019 Rome's MIA Market, the project eventually moved across the Atlantic to Spain. The screenplay was penned by Ortega alongside José Ortuño, who helped to adapt the script to a "Sevillian idiosyncrasy".

Shooting locations included Seville.

Release 
Selected for the 'World Cinema Dramatic Competition' slate, Mamacruz premiered at the 2023 Sundance Film Festival on 20 January 2023. Filmax swooped on international rights to the film in advance of its world premiere.

Reception 
According to the American review aggregation website Rotten Tomatoes, Mamacruz has a 100% approval rating based on 15 reviews from critics, with an average rating of 7.8/10.

Jonathan Holland of ScreenDaily assessed that "the veteran Manver delivers a masterclass in nuance as a quietly-spoken, humble and repressed woman undergoing a violent inner transformation".

Jacob Oller of Paste deemed Mamacruz to be "a vibrant and lovely character study", that "makes the most of its horny matriarch".

Laurence Boyce of Cineuropa deemed the film to be a "personal and affecting piece of work that is both an achingly human portrait of a woman exploring her desires in her later years and a celebration of female sexuality".

See also 
 List of Spanish films of 2023

References 

La Claqueta PC films
2023 comedy films
2020s Spanish-language films
2020s Spanish films
Venezuelan comedy-drama films
Spanish comedy-drama films
Films shot in the province of Seville
Films about old age